The Château de Sarremezan is a 15th-century castle in the commune of Sarremezan in the Haute-Garonne département of France.

Privately owned, it has been listed since 1955 as a monument historique by the French Ministry of Culture. Of particular note is the tower and its staircase.

See also
List of castles in France

References

External links
 

Castles in Haute-Garonne
Monuments historiques of Haute-Garonne